Kyle Charles Calder (born January 5, 1979) is a Canadian former professional ice hockey forward who played in the National Hockey League (NHL) for the Chicago Blackhawks, Philadelphia Flyers, Detroit Red Wings, Los Angeles Kings, and Anaheim Ducks.

Playing career
Calder began his career by playing junior hockey for the Regina Pats of the Western Hockey League (WHL). After scoring 59 points in his sophomore season, he was drafted in the fifth round of the 1997 draft by the Chicago Blackhawks. After his fourth season where he scored 88 points between two teams, he was rewarded with his first professional contract.

Calder began his career by playing for the Cleveland Lumberjacks, the Blackhawks' International Hockey League (IHL) affiliate. He also came up to play in the NHL for the first time that season, playing in eight games. During that time, he also got his first NHL goal.

The following year, after the collapse of the IHL, Calder began and ended his season with the Norfolk Admirals, their new American Hockey League (AHL) affiliate. For a good portion of the season he played for the Blackhawks, appearing in over forty games.

Starting in the 2001–02 NHL season, Calder stayed in the NHL. During the lockout, he spent a brief time in Sweden. He came back to the NHL stronger than ever that season. He led the Blackhawks in goals, assists, and points.

On August 2, 2006, Calder was awarded a $2.9 million contract for the 2006–07 season by an arbitrator. The Blackhawks decided to accept it, and then on August 4, 2006, Calder was traded to the Philadelphia Flyers in exchange for Michal Handzus. At the trade deadline, the Flyers sent him back to Chicago for a third-round draft pick and Lasse Kukkonen. Chicago immediately sent him to the Detroit Red Wings for Jason Williams. Calder scored his first goal as a Red Wing during his first shift. He signed a two-year contract with the Los Angeles Kings on July 2, 2007.

On September 4, 2009, Calder was invited to the Anaheim Ducks training camp for the 2009–10 season. The Ducks however released him on September 26, less than a week before the start of the season. However, he would return to the Ducks organization on October 28 when they signed Calder to a one-year, two-way contract and assigned him to their ECHL affiliate the Bakersfield Condors. On November 14, he was recalled by Anaheim because of injuries to Saku Koivu and Ryan Carter. On December 28, 2009, Calder was waived by the Anaheim Ducks. After clearing waivers, he was assigned to the Toronto Marlies on December 30, 2009.

Career statistics

Regular season and playoffs

International

Awards and honours

References

External links

 

1979 births
Living people
Anaheim Ducks players
Bakersfield Condors (1998–2015) players
Barys Nur-Sultan players
Canadian expatriate ice hockey players in Sweden
Canadian expatriate ice hockey players in the United States
Canadian ice hockey left wingers
Chicago Blackhawks draft picks
Chicago Blackhawks players
Cleveland Lumberjacks players
Detroit Red Wings players
Ice hockey people from Alberta
Kamloops Blazers players
Los Angeles Kings players
Norfolk Admirals players
Philadelphia Flyers players
People from the County of Minburn No. 27
Regina Pats players
Södertälje SK players
Toronto Marlies players